The Gullu Mual (Mwetaung) is a large mine in the east of Burma in the Chin State. Gullu Mual (Mwetaung) represents one of the largest nickel reserve in Tedim Township having estimated reserves of 36.1 million tonnes of ore grading 1.48% nickel. The 36.1 million tonnes of ore contains 0.53 million tonnes of nickel metal.

References 

Nickel mines in Myanmar